Here is a classification of the most notable recipients of the Order of the Liberator General San Martín, the highest order of the Republic of Argentina. Mainly Heads of State, members of Royal families & international VIPs

Grades
 Collar
Grand Cross        
 Grand Officer       
Commander        
Officer                 
Knight

Recipients

Royal Houses 
 King Albert II of Belgium
 King Baudouin of Belgium
 King Philippe of Belgium
 King Abdullah of Saudi Arabia
 King Rama IX of Thailand
 King Carl XVI Gustaf of Sweden
 Queen Margrethe II of Denmark
 Queen Juliana of the Netherlands
 Queen Elizabeth II of the United Kingdom
 Queen Letizia of Spain
 Queen Silvia of Sweden
 King Felipe VI of Spain
 King Juan Carlos I of Spain
 King Olav V of Norway
 Princess Marina, Duchess of Kent
 Princess Benedikte of Denmark
 Prince Philip, Duke of Edinburgh
 Prince Bernhard of the Netherlands
 Shāhanshāh Mohammad Reza of Iran
 Šahbānū Farah of Iran

Politicians 
Konrad Adenauer, Chancellor of Germany
Carmelo Angulo Barturen, Diplomat
Corazón Aquino, 11th President of the Philippines
Andrew Bertie, Prince and Grand Master of the Order of Malta
Carlos Bianchi Chelech, Vice President of the Chilean Senate
Theo van Boven, Lawyer
Francisco Bustillo, Uruguayan Ambassador to Argentina
Rafael Caldera, President of Venezuela
Cuauhtémoc Cárdenas, 1st Head of Government of México City
Antonio Carrillo Flores, Secretary of Finance of Mexico
Elena Ceaușescu, Deputy Prime Minister of Romania
Nicolae Ceaușescu, President of Romania
Camilo José Cela, 1989 Nobel Prize in literature
Rafael Correa, President of Ecuador
Peter Cosgrove, Governor-General of Australia
Francesco Cossiga, 8th President of Italy
Celso Humberto Delgado, Mexican Ambassador to Argentina
Sukarno, 1st President of Indonesia
Otto Eléspuru, General Commander of the Peruvian Army
Enrico Calamai, Italian Consul to Argentina
Patricia Espinosa, Secretary of Foreign Affairs of Mexico
Gerardo Fernández Albor, President of the Xunta of Galicia
José Figueres Ferrer, President of Costa Rica
Vicente Fox, President of Mexico
José García-Margallo y Marfil, Secretary of Foreign Affairs and Cooperation of Spain
Licio Gelli, Venerable Master of the Propaganda Due
José Goñi, Minister of National Defense of Chile
Rafiq Hariri, Prime Minister of Lebanon
Václav Havel, 1st President of the Czech Republic
François Hollande, President of France 
Carlos Ibáñez del Campo 20th President of Chile
Helio Jaguaribe, Secretary of Science and Technology of Brazil
Ban Ki-Moon, 8th Secretary-General of the United Nations
Jean de Lattre de Tassigny, French military, Commander in WWI and WWII
Hipólito Mejía, President of the Dominican Republic 
Marshall Meyer, American Rabbi, Human Rights activist, member of the National Commission on the Disappearance of Persons
Patricia Derian, Assistant Secretary of State for Democracy, Human Rights, and Labor of the United States
Chester Nimitz, American Admiral
Luis Ortiz Monasterio
José María Otero de Navascués
Andrés Pastrana
Ricardo Patiño
Antonio Patriota
Gregorio Peces-Barba
Enrique Peña Nieto
Eva Perón
Juan Domingo Perón (Collar)
Augusto Pinochet
Michel Platini
Augusto Roa Bastos
Alí Rodríguez Araque
Joaquín Ruiz-Giménez Cortés
Sabah Al-Ahmad Al-Jaber Al-Sabah, Kuwaiti Emir.
Julio María Sanguinetti
Martin Schulz
Haile Selassie
Alfredo Stroessner
Franjo Tuđman
Rafael Leónidas Trujillo
Pablo Zala
Noah Mamet, United States of America Ambassador to Argentina.
Ramtane Lamamra, Minister of Foreign Affairs of Algeria.
Xi Jinping, President of the People's Republic of China.
Nicolás Maduro, President of the Bolivarian Republic of Venezuela. (Revoked on 11 August 2017 by President Mauricio Macri.)

External links 
  History of San Martín
  Sanmartinian National Institute
  Foreign Relations Ministry of Argentina

References 

 
Order of the Liberator General San Martín

sv:Orden del Libertador San Martín